Convent Station is a NJ Transit rail station on the Morristown Line. It is located on the grounds of Saint Elizabeth University in Convent Station, Morris Township, New Jersey.

The station first opened in 1867. A small wooden structure was built in 1876 and called Convent Station. The existing station house, built in 1913–1914, has two side platforms, with the station house on the eastbound platform. A ticket office and waiting room is open weekdays. On the westbound track a brick waiting house stands. A former freight station is on the eastbound side. The main driveway into the college is located at a level crossing at the east end of the platform.

Nearby are several office complexes, including the headquarters of Honeywell to the north and Pfizer at Giralda Farms to the east.  The Traction Line Recreation Trail, formerly a line of the Morris County Traction Company, runs along the northeastern side of the line.

Station layout
The station has two tracks, each with a low-level side platform.

See also
List of NJ Transit railroad stations
Operating Passenger Railroad Stations Thematic Resource (New Jersey)

References

External links

 

NJ Transit Rail Operations stations
Railway stations in Morris County, New Jersey
Railway stations in the United States opened in 1867
Former Delaware, Lackawanna and Western Railroad stations
1867 establishments in New Jersey
Railway stations in New Jersey at university and college campuses